Sean Dominic Robertson (born 6 June 2001) is a professional footballer who plays as a midfielder for EFL League Two club Crewe Alexandra on loan from  Forest Green Rovers.

Career
Robertson started his career in the Academy at Crystal Palace, and had trials with Sheffield United and Derby County. He signed with Forest Green Rovers in August 2022, with head coach Ian Burchnall noting the youngster's versatility. He made his professional debut on 6 August 2022, coming on as a 61st-minute substitute for Kyle McAllister in a 2–1 defeat to Ipswich Town at The New Lawn, before joining Crewe Alexandra on loan in January 2023 until the end of the season. Robertson was sent off in his third Crewe appearance, in a 2–2 draw at Crawley Town on 11 February 2023.

Style of play
Robertson can play as a wing-back, as a winger, or as part of a front three.

Career statistics

References

2001 births
Living people
English footballers
Black British sportsmen
Association football wingers
English Football League players
Crystal Palace F.C. players
Forest Green Rovers F.C. players
Crewe Alexandra F.C. players